The 2006 Laurence Olivier Awards were held in 2006 in London celebrating excellence in West End theatre by the Society of London Theatre.

Winners and nominees
Details of winners (in bold) and nominees, in each award category, per the Society of London Theatre.

Productions with multiple nominations and awards
The following 15 productions, including three operas, received multiple nominations:

 9: Billy Elliot
 8: Guys and Dolls
 6: Don Carlos, Hedda Gabler and Mary Stuart
 4: Coram Boy
 3: Acorn Antiques, Death of a Salesman and La clemenza di Tito
 2: Billy Budd, Heroes, H.M.S. Pinafore, Madama Butterfly, PUSH and The Big Life

The following three productions received multiple awards:

 4: Billy Elliot and Hedda Gabler
 2: Guys and Dolls

See also
 60th Tony Awards

References

External links
 Previous Olivier Winners – 2006

Laurence Olivier Awards ceremonies
Laurence Olivier Awards, 2006
Laurence Olivier Awards
Laur
Laurence Olivier Awards